Albert Gay (born Albert Goldstein; 25 February 1928 – 12 October 2013) was a British jazz tenor saxophonist.

Biography
After having played with the Jive Bombers, Gay worked with Freddy Randall from 1953, and would return several times to Randall's future line-ups. In the early 1960s, he was with Bob Wallis' Storyville Jazzmen before going on to join Alex Welsh.

With fellow tenors Dick Morrissey and Stan Robinson, baritone sax Paul Carroll, and trumpets Ian Carr, Kenny Wheeler and Greg Brown, Al Gay formed part of The Animals' Big Band that made its one-and-only public appearance at the 5th Annual British Jazz & Blues Festival in Richmond on 5 August 1965.

In 1978, he played with the World's Greatest Jazz Band. As well as leading his own line-ups, Gay has also played in bands led by Digby Fairweather, Laurie Chescoe and Ron Russell, as well as with the Pizza Express All Stars.

Personal life and death
Gay lived in Bedfordshire until his death in 2013; an obituary appeared in Jazz Journal's March 2014 edition.

Discography
As sideman
1967: Hear Me Talkin''' – Ruby Braff
1967: A Portrait of Henry "Red" Allen – Henry "Red" Allen/The Alex Welsh Band 	
1978: 100 Years of American Dixieland Jazz – Johnny Mince (Flutegrove)
1994: After Awhile'' – Dick Sudhalter

References

1928 births
2013 deaths
Place of birth missing
British jazz saxophonists
British male saxophonists
British male jazz musicians
20th-century saxophonists